Robert "Bobby" Grim (September 4, 1924 – June 14, 1995) was an American racecar driver.

Born in Coal City, Indiana, Grim died of cancer in Indianapolis, Indiana. He drove in the USAC Championship Car series, racing in the 1958-1969 seasons with 66 starts, including the Indianapolis 500 races each year from 1959-1968 except 1965.  He finished in the top ten 30 times, with his one victory coming in 1960 at Syracuse.  He won the 1959 Indy Rookie of the Year, despite finishing in 26th position.  He was also the IMCA sprint car champion from 1955-1958 driving the famed "Black Deuce" Offy of Hector Honore. Grim was the 1959 Indianapolis 500 Rookie of the Year.

Complete USAC Championship Car results

Indianapolis 500 results

World Championship career summary
The Indianapolis 500 was part of the FIA World Championship from 1950 through 1960. Drivers competing at Indy during those years were credited with World Championship points and participation. Bobby Grim participated in 2 World Championship races. He started on the pole 0 times, won 0 races, set 0 fastest laps, and finished on the podium 0 times. He accumulated a total of 0 championship points.

Award
He was inducted in the National Sprint Car Hall of Fame in 1992.

References

1924 births
1995 deaths
American racing drivers
Deaths from cancer in Indiana
Indianapolis 500 drivers
Indianapolis 500 Rookies of the Year
National Sprint Car Hall of Fame inductees
People from Owen County, Indiana
Racing drivers from Indiana